The water polo tournaments at the 2015 European Games in Baku, Azerbaijan were held at the Baku Aquatics Centre in the Baku Games Cluster from 12 to 21 June 2015. 16 teams competed in the men's tournament and 12 teams in the women's tournament.

Water polo was not included in the earliest list of sports confirmed for the 2015 Games, as the European swimming authorities at that stage were minded not to take part. However, following negotiations with the organising authorities, a compromise was reached whereby, in 2015, these events were for junior players only - in effect, athletes between the ages of 16 and 17 for both men and women.

Qualification 
Both of Azerbaijan's teams automatically qualify. The 2013 European Junior Championships will qualify automatically, as well as the qualification tournaments for the 2015 European Junior Championships will serve as qualification tournaments for the Games. Each qualifying team will be allowed to select 13 athletes for their team.

Men

Women

Medal summary

Events

References 

 
Sports at the 2015 European Games
Euro
2015